The 2021 CFL season was the 67th season of modern-day Canadian football. Officially, it was the 63rd season of the Canadian Football League. The regular season began on August 5 and ended November 20. Each team played 14 regular season games over 16 weeks. Previously, the season was scheduled to begin on June 10 and end on October 30, with 18 games being played per team over 21 weeks, but this was delayed due to the COVID-19 pandemic in Canada. Hamilton hosted the 108th Grey Cup on December 12, 2021.

League business

Resumption of play
The 2020 season was postponed on numerous occasions  because federal and provincial governments forbade attendance at sporting events in an effort to stop the COVID-19 pandemic in Canada. The league ultimately decided to hold a shortened season in a "bubble" without fans in attendance. However, on August 17, the league called off the season. The federal and provincial governments refused to provide the subsidies needed to cover the expenses necessary for the season to be held. Additionally, public health officials could not guarantee they could approve the league's "bubble" proposal in time to complete the season before Canada's harsh winters set in. At the same time, commissioner Randy Ambrosie guaranteed a return to play in 2021, with fans in attendance at full capacity, without regard to the status of the pandemic by that time.

Renaming of the Edmonton team
On June 1, 2021, Edmonton's CFL team announced that it adopted a new name, the Edmonton Elks. The team had previously retired its "Edmonton Eskimos" branding on July 21, 2020, and started to temporarily use "Edmonton Football Team" and "EE Football Team", on grounds that the term Eskimo had been considered an offensive term to refer to Inuit.

Salary cap
According to the new collective bargaining agreement, the 2021 salary cap was scheduled to be $5,350,000 (or an average of $118,888 per active roster spot). That number was subject to change as players would have revenue sharing of 20% from broadcast deals, but could also change due to the COVID-19 pandemic. Individual minimum salaries were set at $65,000 in 2021 for National and American players. Since no 2020 CFL Draft pick signed a contract in the cancelled 2020 season, this was the first season with all CFL Draft picks subject to a pay scale, with the first overall pick earning approximately $85,000.

Schedule
The league originally released the season's full schedule on November 20, 2020, which featured a 21-week regular season schedule. The regular season was scheduled to begin on June 10 with a rematch of the 107th Grey Cup with the defending champion Winnipeg Blue Bombers hosting the Hamilton Tiger-Cats. Notably, the schedule featured more intra-divisional games, with BC, Calgary, and Edmonton playing 12 such games, Saskatchewan and Winnipeg playing 11 divisional games, and the East Division teams playing 10 divisional games (an increase of one to two divisional games per team). This was done to reduce cross-country travel. The Toronto Argonauts were scheduled to play a neutral site game on July 19 against the Calgary Stampeders at a location that was supposed to be announced at a later date.

However, due to the ongoing COVID-19 pandemic, the league confirmed on April 21 that the season would be delayed until at least August 5, with a revised schedule released on June 15. This version featured 14 regular season games with even more of a focus on intra-divisional games as the Blue Bombers and Redblacks did not play against each other in the regular season and each team played approximately eight divisional games. As the league anticipated capacity limits to be more lenient in Western Canada, the CFL aligned its schedule to have all East division teams begin their seasons at West division opponents for at least the first two weeks of the season.

If a game postponed due to a COVID-19 outbreak could not have been made up within the regular season schedule, the team(s) affected by the outbreak would be charged with losses by forfeit. If at least 85% of a team's players had received at least one vaccine dose, players received their salary for the unplayed game and the team was credited with a 1–0 win.

Potential partnership with the XFL
On March 10, the CFL confirmed it was pursuing discussions with the consortium that owns the XFL about some form of partnership, the details of which were not made public. The XFL, which was slated to return in 2022 following its abrupt shutdown and sale in March 2020, paused plans to return pending the results of those discussions. The discussions ended on July 7, with no action taken. The XFL subsequently confirmed it would not resume play until 2023 at the earliest.

Global players
After first being introduced for the 2019 CFL season, the league featured two active roster spots for players designated as "global" players for each team. Each team also had up to three spots on their practice rosters for global players. Global players were defined as those who did not hold Canadian or American citizenship nor did they qualify as a National player in any other way. This was subject to change after the cancellation of Global Combines in 2020 due to the COVID-19 pandemic.

COVID-19 restrictions 
Some CFL teams enforced limitations on spectator capacity for their games.  Even without capacity restrictions, teams still employed enhanced health and safety protocols, such as increased access to sanitization, paperless transactions and digital tickets. With announcements by the Edmonton Elks and Saskatchewan Roughriders on August 30, all CFL teams announced plans to require that spectators present proof that they are vaccinated for COVID-19, either as the result of a voluntary decision, or as the result of provincial public health orders requiring proof of vaccine (British Columbia, Manitoba, and Quebec).

Player movement

Signing moratorium
With the 2020 CFL season initially postponed and then ultimately cancelled, the league had placed a moratorium on re-signing players. Teams were able to re-sign players after December 7, 2020, at 12:00 p.m. ET.

Free agency
The 2021 free agency period began on February 9 at 12:00 p.m. ET. Similar to the previous off-season, pending free agents and teams were able to negotiate offers for one week starting January 31, ending February 7. All formal offers to a player during this time would be sent to both the league and the players union and could not be rescinded.

Trade deadline
The in-season trade deadline was on October 27 at 5:00 pm ET.

Regular season

Standings

Postseason

The Grey Cup was played at Tim Hortons Field in Hamilton, Ontario, on December 12, 2021.

Playoff bracket

*-Team won in Overtime.

Broadcasting
The CFL was broadcast on TSN and RDS across all platforms in Canada as part of their contract. The broadcast rights were reported to have been extended through 2025.

Award winners

CFL Top Performers of the Week

Source

CFL Top Performers of the Month

Source

2021 CFL All-Stars

Offence 
QB – Zach Collaros, Winnipeg Blue Bombers
RB – William Stanback, Montreal Alouettes
R – Kenny Lawler, Winnipeg Blue Bombers
R – Eugene Lewis, Montreal Alouettes
R – Bryan Burnham, BC Lions
R – Lucky Whitehead, BC Lions
R – Jake Wieneke, Montreal Alouettes
OT – Stanley Bryant, Winnipeg Blue Bombers
OT – Jermarcus Hardrick, Winnipeg Blue Bombers
OG – Brandon Revenberg, Hamilton Tiger-Cats
OG – Patrick Neufeld, Winnipeg Blue Bombers
C – Sean McEwen, Calgary Stampeders

Defence 
DT – Mike Rose, Calgary Stampeders
DT – Shawn Oakman, Toronto Argonauts
DE – Jackson Jeffcoat, Winnipeg Blue Bombers
DE – Willie Jefferson, Winnipeg Blue Bombers
LB – Adam Bighill, Winnipeg Blue Bombers
LB – Simoni Lawrence, Hamilton Tiger-Cats
CLB – Chris Edwards, Toronto Argonauts
CB – DeAundre Alford,  Winnipeg Blue Bombers
CB – Jumal Rolle,  Hamilton Tiger-Cats
HB – Cariel Brooks, Hamilton Tiger-Cats
HB – Deatrick Nichols, Winnipeg Blue Bombers
S – Brandon Alexander, Winnipeg Blue Bombers

Special teams 
K – Rene Paredes, Calgary Stampeders
P – Richie Leone, Ottawa Redblacks
ST – DeVonte Dedmon, Ottawa Redblacks

Source

2021 CFL Western All-Stars

Offence 
QB – Zach Collaros, Winnipeg Blue Bombers
RB – Ka'Deem Carey, Calgary Stampeders
R – Kenny Lawler, Winnipeg Blue Bombers
R – Lucky Whitehead, BC Lions
R – Bryan Burnham, BC Lions
R – Kamar Jorden, Calgary Stampeders
R – Nic Demski, Winnipeg Blue Bombers
OT – Stanley Bryant, Winnipeg Blue Bombers
OT – Jermarcus Hardrick, Winnipeg Blue Bombers
OG – Drew Desjarlais, Winnipeg Blue Bombers
OG – Patrick Neufeld, Winnipeg Blue Bombers
C – Sean McEwen, Calgary Stampeders

Defence 
DT – Micah Johnson, Saskatchewan Roughriders
DT – Mike Rose, Calgary Stampeders
DE – Jackson Jeffcoat, Winnipeg Blue Bombers
DE – Willie Jefferson, Winnipeg Blue Bombers
LB – Adam Bighill, Winnipeg Blue Bombers
LB – Darnell Sankey, Calgary Stampeders
CLB – Alden Darby, Winnipeg Blue Bombers
CB – DeAundre Alford,  Winnipeg Blue Bombers
CB – Nick Marshall, Saskatchewan Roughriders
HB – T.J. Lee, BC Lions
HB – Deatrick Nichols, Winnipeg Blue Bombers
S – Brandon Alexander, Winnipeg Blue Bombers

Special teams 
K – Rene Paredes, Calgary Stampeders
P – Cody Grace, Calgary Stampeders
ST – Mike Miller, Winnipeg Blue Bombers

Source

2021 CFL Eastern All-Stars

Offence 
QB – McLeod Bethel-Thompson, Toronto Argonauts
RB – William Stanback, Montreal Alouettes
R – Eugene Lewis, Montreal Alouettes
R – Jake Wieneke, Montreal Alouettes
R – Kurleigh Gittens Jr., Toronto Argonauts
R – Tim White, Hamilton Tiger-Cats
R – Jaelon Acklin, Hamilton Tiger-Cats
OT – Landon Rice, Montreal Alouettes
OT – Chris Van Zeyl, Hamilton Tiger-Cats
OG – Brandon Revenberg, Hamilton Tiger-Cats
OG – Kristian Matte, Montreal Alouettes
C – Peter Nicastro, Toronto Argonauts

Defence 
DT – Dylan Wynn, Hamilton Tiger-Cats
DT – Shawn Oakman, Toronto Argonauts
DE – Ja'Gared Davis, Hamilton Tiger-Cats
DE – David Ménard, Montreal Alouettes
LB – Simoni Lawrence, Hamilton Tiger-Cats
LB – Avery Williams, Ottawa Redblacks
CLB – Chris Edwards, Toronto Argonauts
CB – Jumal Rolle,  Hamilton Tiger-Cats
CB – Monshadrik Hunter, Montreal Alouettes
HB – Cariel Brooks, Hamilton Tiger-Cats
HB – Shaquille Richardson, Toronto Argonauts
S – Tunde Adeleke, Hamilton Tiger-Cats

Special teams 
K – Boris Bede, Toronto Argonauts
P – Richie Leone, Ottawa Redblacks
ST – DeVonte Dedmon, Ottawa Redblacks

Source

2021 CFL Awards
 CFL's Most Outstanding Player Award – Zach Collaros (QB), Winnipeg Blue Bombers
 CFL's Most Outstanding Canadian Award – Bo Lokombo (LB), BC Lions
 CFL's Most Outstanding Defensive Player Award – Adam Bighill (LB), Winnipeg Blue Bombers
 CFL's Most Outstanding Offensive Lineman Award – Stanley Bryant, (OL), Winnipeg Blue Bombers
 CFL's Most Outstanding Rookie Award – Jordan Williams (LB), BC Lions
 John Agro Special Teams Award – DeVonte Dedmon (KR), Ottawa Redblacks
 Tom Pate Memorial Award – Mike Daly (DB), Hamilton Tiger-Cats
 Jake Gaudaur Veterans' Trophy – Chris Van Zeyl (OL), Hamilton Tiger-Cats
 Annis Stukus Trophy – Mike O'Shea, Winnipeg Blue Bombers
 Commissioner's Award – Nurse Sara May, Hamilton-area nurse to honour her work during Covid-19 pandemic
 Hugh Campbell Distinguished Leadership Award – Doctors McCormack and Naidu, CFL Chief Medical Officers
 Jane Mawby Tribute Award - Carol Longmuir, director of finance and administration, BC Lions

References

Canadian Football League seasons
2021 in Canadian football
Gridiron football events postponed due to the COVID-19 pandemic